The Closer You Get is the second album by English indie rock band Six by Seven, recorded at The Square Centre in Nottingham with Ric Peet (who produced one track on their first album), and John Leckie, (who has worked with many British bands including Radiohead and Simple Minds).

After the album's release, and just before playing at Glastonbury, guitarist Sam Hempton quit the band.

The album was critically acclaimed and appeared in several music magazine end-of-year polls, including those by NME and Melody Maker.

Track listing

Personnel
Chris Olley – vocals, guitar
Sam Hempton – guitar
Paul Douglas – bass
Chris Davis – drums
James Flower – keyboards

References

Six by Seven albums
2000 albums
Albums produced by John Leckie